Ufuk Yıkılmaz (born 27 December 1986), better known by his stage name Şehinşah and also known as HSNSBBH, is a Turkish rapper and songwriter.

Life 
Yıkılmaz was born in Erzincan, Turkey, in last days of 1986. He has started writing lyrics for rap when he was at middleschool.

Discography

Albums 

He has also voiced 5 tracks in DJ Artz's İşin Mutfağı album. (2017)

Singles and duets 

Kapıları Çalan Benim (ft. Şanışer & Karamamba)
Madafuckin Noise
Sevgi Ülkesinin İrticacı P*zevenkleri (ft. Karaçalı)
Sahneyi Terk Edin  (ft. Patron) 
Kitle Kiste Mahkum (ft. Saian)
Cesetten Balyalar (ft. Saian)
Ne (ft. Saian)
Biz Evde Yine Bir Gün (ft. Patron & Saian)
Haşşaşin Marşı
Şahmeran (ft. Patron)
Zamanın Doldu (ft. Patron)
Koca Götüne Vazelin (ft. Patron)
Kalk (ft. Patron)
Duygusal Olmaya Gerek Yok (ft. Sansar Salvo)
İddiali Cümleler Ülkesi
İsterik Nameler (ft. Playa)
Tebligat Verin 
Apartman Savaşları
Amın Amına Koyacan
Hepsi Benim
Kötüyüm
Cannabis (ft. Keişan)
Doldu Şarjör (ft. Sansar Salvo)
İstila
Fame Peşindeki Çocuğun Dramı
Cehennem Senfoni
Hiphop Okulu
Güller & Rhyme
Hayal (2014)
Üzülme (2016)
Karma (2017)
Islah (ft. Muşta) (2018)
Şüpheli Şahıs (ft. Şam) (2018)
Yak Yak Yak (2018)
Marslı Kadın (2018)
Boing (2018)
Milyon (2018)
Dünya'dan Atlas'a (2018)
Kıskanç (ft. Kubilay Karça) (2019)
Pirana (2019)
Yok Sana (ft. Bossy) (2019)
Bahaneleriniz (ft. Muşta) (2019)
Yaz Yağmurum (2019)
Shredder'ı Krang'in (2019)
Çocuk (2019)
Talep-Arz (2019)
Press (ft. Ati242) (2019)
İmza (ft. Hidra) (2019)
Baban (2020)
Kabul Olmaz Bizim Gibiler (ft. Vio) (2020)
Trump (HSNSBBH ismiyle) (2020)
Kunteper (2020)
Nedeni Var (ft. Helineda) (2020)  (from Arda Gezer's Episode 1 album)
Dön Dünya (ft. Cem Adrian) (2020)
Darılmak Yok (2020)
Eksik Olmaz (ft. Atik & Nosta) (2021)
Samanyolu (2021)
MATRIX (ft. Spade427) (2021)
Bi Ona! Bi Buna! (ft. Yazox) (2021)
KADER (ft. Aspova) (2021)
Anunakiler (ft. Ati242, Hidra, Lia Shine) (2021)
The Face of Vision (2021)
Hadi Yaparsın (2022)
Diabolico (2022)
+28 (Tirat) (2022)
Taktik (ft. Ebru Keskin) (2022)
Nefret (ft. Arda Gezer & Sali) (2022)
Yaşamak (ft. Kum) (2022)

References 

Living people
1986 births
Turkish rappers
Turkish male singers
Turkish hip hop
Turkish lyricists
People from Erzincan